Rajya Sabha elections were held on various dates in 2011, to elect members of the Rajya Sabha, Indian Parliament's upper chamber. The elections were held on 22 July  to elect respectively 1 member from Goa, 3 members from Gujarat and 6 members from West Bengal for the Council of States, the Rajya Sabha.

Elections
Elections were held to elect members from Goa, Gujarat and West Bengal.

Members elected
The following members are elected in the elections held in 2011.

Members retired 

State - Member - Party
 GA - Shantaram Naik - INC
 GJ - Ahmed Patel - INC
 GJ - Pravin Naik - BJP
 GJ - Surendra Motilal Patel - BJP
 WB - Abani Roy - RSP
 WB - vacant (D of Arjun Kumar Sengupta) - IND.
 WB - Mohammed Amin - CPM
 WB - Brinda Karat - CPM
 WB - Sitaram Yechury - CPM
 WB - Swapan Sadhan Bose - AITC

Bye-elections
The bye-elections were also held for the vacant seats from the State of Karnataka, Madhya Pradesh, Maharashtra & Tamil Nadu, Assam and Bihar.

 Bye-elections were held on 3 March 2011 for vacancy from Karnataka due to death of seating member M. Rajasekara Murthy on 05/12/2010 with term ending on 02/04/2012.Hema Malini from BJP became the member.
 Bye-elections were held on 12 May 2011 for vacancy from Madhya Pradesh due to death of seating member Arjun Singh on 04/03/2011 with term ending on 02/04/2012.Meghraj Jain from BJP became the member.
 Bye-elections were held on 22 July 2011 for vacancy from Maharashtra due to resignation of seating member Prithviraj Chavan on 06/05/2011 with term ending on 02/04/2014 and from Tamil Nadu due to resignation of K. P. Ramalingam on 20/05/2011 with term ending on 29/06/2016.Husain Dalwai of INC from MH got elected. A. W. Rabi Bernard of AIADMK from TN got elected.
 Bye-elections were held on 22 December 2011 for vacancy from Assam due to death of seating member Silvius Condpan on 10/10/2011 with term ending on 02/04/2016 and from Bihar due to resignation of Sabir Ali of LJP on 15/11/2011 with term ending on 09/04/2014. Pankaj Bora of INC got elected from Assam.Sabir Ali got re-elected from Bihar as JDU candidate.

References

2011 elections in India
2011